Il viaggio may refer to:
 The Voyage (1921 film), an Italian silent drama film
 The Voyage (1974 film), an Italian film
 Il viaggio (2017 film), an Italian film